Clepsis chishimana is a species of moth of the family Tortricidae. It is found in Russia (the Kuril Islands) and Japan (Honshu).

The wingspan is 18–23 mm.

References

Moths described in 1965
Clepsis